Beaujon Aircraft, also known as Beaujon Ultralights, is an American aircraft design company, located in Ardmore, Oklahoma.

History
Founded by Herbert Beaujon in the 1970s, Beaujon Aircraft has published the designs for eight ultralight aircraft and marketed seven of them in book form under the name How to Build Ultralights. The book and its plans have received praise from reviewers. Andre Cliche wrote:

Beaujon's designs have been described as "beautifully simple" and have been used to construct many flying examples.

Beaujon has made the plans for one of his earlier designs, the wooden winged, three axis control Enduro available for free download as 25 JPEGs.

Aircraft

References

External links

Aircraft manufacturers of the United States
Companies based in Ardmore, Oklahoma
Manufacturing companies based in Oklahoma